Nikolo-Ushna is a rural locality (a village) in Malyshevskoye Rural Settlement, Selivanovsky District, Vladimir Oblast, Russia. The population was 47 as of 2010.

Geography 
Nikolo-Ushna is located on the Ushna River, 32 km southwest of Krasnaya Gorbatka (the district's administrative centre) by road. Karpovo is the nearest rural locality.

References 

Rural localities in Selivanovsky District